Scopula omissa is a moth of the  family Geometridae. It is found in Bolivia.

References

Moths described in 1906
omissa
Moths of South America